Thomas Adamson STL (30 September 1901–21 April 1991), a 20th-century Roman Catholic priest, served as domestic prelate to Pope Pius XII then as a canon residentiary of Liverpool Metropolitan Cathedral, before becoming archdiocesan vicar general.

Early life
Born in 1901 at Alston Lane near Preston, the eldest son of George Adamson (1877–1952) and his wife Teresa (d. 1939), daughter of Thomas Higginson, his patrilineal ancestors were Lancashire recusants. Among his three uncles who entered holy orders was the Revd James Adamson, vice-president of Ushaw College, while a collateral ancestor, Dom Richard, a monk at Holm Cultram Abbey after the Dissolution of the Monasteries, became vicar of Bexley, Kent.

Adamson attended St Edward's College, West Derby, then St Joseph's College, Upholland, before graduating from St Mary's College, Oscott. He pursued further studies at the Pontifical Gregorian University, Rome, receiving the degree of Licentiate of Moral Theology.

Ecclesiastical career
Ordained a priest in the Church of Rome in 1926, Adamson went up to Beda College when Mgr Charles Duchemin was rector, and upon his return to Britain served from 1928 until 1945 as Private Secretary to the Most Revd Richard Downey, Archbishop of Liverpool. 

Parish priest of St Clare's Church, Liverpool from 1945, he became Supernumerary Privy Chamberlain to Pope Pius XI in 1932 and a domestic prelate to the Pope in 1955. Thereafter, Adamson served as vicar general of the Archdiocese of Liverpool from 1955 until 1965 and, in 1966, was appointed Protonotary Apostolic to Pope Paul VI and later a conventual chaplain of the Sovereign Military Order of Malta.

Adamson died in 1991 at Lourdes Hospital (now Spire Hospital), Liverpool.

See also
Catholic Church in England
Order of Malta
Roman Curia

References

External links
 Mgr Thomas Adamson: Who's Who (1991)
 Burke's Landed Gentry online: ADAMSON formerly of Hurst Hall

1901 births	
1991 deaths
People from Preston (district)
Alumni of St Mary's College, Oscott
Pontifical Gregorian University alumni
Roman Catholic domestic prelates
Apostolic pronotaries
20th-century English Roman Catholic priests
Clergy from Liverpool
British expatriates in Italy